Fürth Stadthalle station is a Nuremberg U-Bahn station, located on the U1 in Fürth.

References

Nuremberg U-Bahn stations
Railway stations in Germany opened in 1998
Buildings and structures completed in 1998